Caenis amica is a species of mayfly in the genus Caenis. It has an average lifespan of a few days like most mayflies and lives near rivers in the Americas.

References

Mayflies
Insects of North America
Insects of South America
Insects described in 1861